The 1980–81 Colorado Rockies season was the Rockies' fifth season, and seventh season of the franchise. Bill MacMillan was hired to coach the team, replacing Don Cherry. Like five of the previous six seasons, the Rockies did not qualify for the playoffs.

Regular season

Final standings

Schedule and results

Player statistics

Regular season
Scoring

Goaltending

Note: GP = Games played; G = Goals; A = Assists; Pts = Points; +/- = Plus/minus; PIM = Penalty minutes; PPG=Power-play goals; SHG=Short-handed goals; GWG=Game-winning goals
      MIN=Minutes played; W = Wins; L = Losses; T = Ties; GA = Goals against; GAA = Goals against average; SO = Shutouts;

Draft picks
Colorado's draft picks at the 1980 NHL Entry Draft held at the Montreal Forum in Montreal, Quebec.

See also
 1980–81 NHL season

References

External links

Colorado Rockies (NHL) seasons
Colorado
Colorado
Colorado Rockies
Colorado Rockies